The Definitive Collection is a compilation album by Eliza Carthy.

The recordings were made between 1995 and 2002. The tracks are taken from Waterson:Carthy (Waterson:Carthy 1995), Red (Eliza Carthy 1998, three tracks), Eliza Carthy And the Kings of Calicutt (Eliza Carthy 1997, two tracks), Heat, Light and Sound (Eliza Carthy 1996), Common Tongue (Waterson:Carthy 1997), A Dark Light (Waterson: Carthy 2003), Mysterious Day (Oliver Knight 2002) and Shining Bright - The Songs of Lal and Mike Waterson. Issued on CD in 2003. Running time 68 minutes 18 seconds.

Track listing

 "The Light Dragoon" (Traditional) 
 "Greenwood Laddie" (song)/ "Mrs Capron's Reel" (instrumental)/ "Tune" (instrumental) (Traditional) 
 "Mother, Go Make My Bed"/ "Flower of Swiss Cottage" (Traditional) 
 "Cold, Wet and Rainy Night" (song)/ "The Grand Hornpipe" (instrumental) (Traditional) 
 "Fisher Boy" (Traditional) 
 "Billy Boy" (song)/ "The Widdow's Wedding" (instrumental) (Traditional) 
 "French Stroller" (Traditional) 
 "Stumbling On" (Elaine Waterson, Oliver Knight) 
 "Blow the Winds"/ "The Game of Draughts" (Traditional) 
 "Mons Meg" (Traditional) 
 "Diego's Bold Shore" (Traditional) 
 "Go From My Window" (Traditional) 
 "Child Among the Weeds" (Elaine Waterson)

References

 Review
 Track listing
 Official website

2003 compilation albums
Eliza Carthy albums